Dru Pagliassotti (born November 29, 1966) is an author of fantasy literature and the editor of The Harrow online magazine.

Xyr first published novel was Clockwork Heart, a steampunk fantasy novel about an Icarus-winged heroine, Taya, who stumbles into a murder mystery when she rescues a high caste official of the layered City of Ondinium.  The novel, published by Juno Books in April 2008, received an excellent review from Drew Bittner of SFRevu. Pagliassotti's writing was compared to the work of China Miéville and D. M. Cornish. and the novel was translated to French and German. Pagliassotti was then signed to a trilogy deal with Hades Publications which included a republishing of Clockwork Heart under the EDGE  imprint in September 2013, followed by Iron Wind in March 2014, and Heavy Fire in September 2014.

Since 1998 Pagliassotti has been the editor in chief and publisher of The Harrow and owner of The Harrow Press. The Harrow was a peer reviewed online literary magazine designed to support new writers as they develop their careers.  The magazine published two anthologies of horror fiction.

Pagliassotti is also a professor in the communication department of California Lutheran University, where xe researches yaoi or "boys' love" fiction (manga, anime, visual novels and dōjinshi) from Japan.

In 2009, Pagliassotti was named one of the Year's Best Fantasy writers, qualifying her story "Bookmarked" to be published in the 21st edition of The Year's Best Fantasy & Horror.

Works

Novels
 An Agreement with Hell (2011)
 Clockwork Heart (2008/2013)
 Iron Wind (2014)
 Heavy Fire (2014)

Short stories
 "The Manufactory" in Ceaseless Steam: Steampunk Stories from Beneath Ceaseless Skies (2012)
 "Ghost in the Machine" in The Mammoth Book of Ghost Romance (2012)
 "Code of Blood" in Corsets & Clockwork (2011)
 "After the Sleep" in Alien Shots (2011)
 "Pan de Los Muertos" in Dia de Los Muertos (2010)
 "To Every Thing there is a Season" in Apexology (2010)
 "Peter, Peter" in The Three-Lobed Burning Eye Annual, v. 4 (2009)
 "The Manufactory" in Beneath Ceaseless Skies (2009)
 "Terminus" with Jo Gerrard in Magic & Mechanica (2009)
 "Bookmarked" in Reflection’s Edge (2007) - Honorable Mention, Year's Best Fantasy and Horror (2008)
 "Night Shift" in Worlds of Wonder (2007)
 "Changing the End" in Anotherealm (2007)
 "Defender of the Faith" in Reflection’s Edge (2006)
 "Strange Vintage" in Fear of the Unknown (2005)
 "Joseph’s Plaint" in Ideomancer (2004)
 "Peter, Peter" in Three-Lobed Burning Ey (2003)
 "Pan de los Muertos" in Strange Horizons (2003)
 "After the Sleep" in Dark Fire (2003)
 "Analogues" in Erratica (1997)

Academic

References

External links
 DruPagliassotti.com official site

1966 births
21st-century American novelists
American women novelists
American fantasy writers
Living people
Anime and manga critics
Steampunk writers
Women science fiction and fantasy writers
21st-century American women writers